James MacGillivray or McGillivray may refer to:

Politicians
James McGillivray, politician in Social Credit Party of Canada leadership elections
James J. McGillivray, Canadian-born American politician

Others
James Pittendrigh Macgillivray, Scottish poet
James MacGillivray (journalist), see Paul Bunyan
James MacGillivray, dancer with Scottish Dance Theatre
James McGillivray (soccer), coach for St. Catharines Wolves